is the 50th single by AKB48, released on November 22, 2017. The song was performed during CDTV's Halloween Special Festival and Mayu Watanabe's graduation concert before its release.

The coupling song "Ikiru koto ni Nekkyou wo" was performed on the group's variety show AKBingo! on October 4, 2017.

It is also Mayu Watanabe's last single appearance with the group.

Release and Promotion 
The CD was released in various editions: five limited editions (Type A, Type B, Type C, Type D and Type E) as well as five regular editions (Type A, B, C, D and E) and a Theater Edition. The center for this single is Mayu Watanabe and this is her last single as an AKB48 member.

A short version for the music was released on YouTube on October 29, 2017. The full version was released on YouTube on March 13, 2018, after the 51st single, "Jabaja"'s music video was released on February 27, 2018.

Track listing

Type A

Type B

Type C

Type D

Type E

Theater Edition

Senbatsu 
 Team A: Anna Iriyama, Yui Yokoyama
 Team K: Minami Minegishi, Mion Mukaichi
 Team B: Yuki Kashiwagi, Rena Kato, Mayu Watanabe
 Team 4: Nana Okada, Mako Kojima, Juri Takahashi
 Team 8: Rin Okabe, Yui Oguri
 Team S: Jurina Matsui
 Team KII: Yuna Obata
 Team E: Akari Suda
 Team N: Ayaka Yamamoto, Sayaka Yamamoto
 Team M: Miru Shiroma, Akari Yoshida
 Team H : Haruka Kodama, Rino Sashihara, Miku Tanaka
 Team KIV: Sakura Miyawaki
 Team TII: Hana Matsuoka
 Team NIII: Yuka Ogino, Rie Kitahara, Rika Nakai
 STU48 Kenkyuusei: Yumiko Takino

"Sayonara de Owaru Wake Janai" 
Mayuyu
Graduation Song
Team B: Watanabe Mayu

"Omoidasete Yokatta"
STU48 (16 Members) (Takino Yumiko Center)

STU48 1st Generation: Ishida Chiho, Ishida Minami, Isogai Kanon, Ichioka Ayumi, Imamura Mitsuki, Iwata Hina, Okada Nana, Kadowaki Miyuna, Sano Haruka, Takino Yumiko, Tanaka Kouko, Torobu Yuri, Fukuda Akari, Fujiwara Azusa, Mori Kaho, Yabushita Fu

"Ikiru Koto ni Nekkyou wo!"
Team 8 (チーム8) (20 Members) (Oguri Yui & Kuranoo Narumi Centers)

Team 8: Utada Hatsuka, Ota Nao, Onishi Momoka, Okabe Rin, Oguri Yui, Oda Erina, Kuranoo Narumi, Sakaguchi Nagisa, Sato Akari, Sato Shiori, Sato Nanami, Shitao Miu, Shimoaoki Karin, Tanikawa Hijiri, Nakano Ikumi, Nagano Serika, Hitomi Kotone, Honda Hitomi, Yamada Nanami, Yoshikawa Nanase

"Hohoemi no Toki"
7byou-go, Kimi ga Suki ni naru. (7秒後、君が好きになる。) (7 Members) (Komiyama Haruka Center)

Team A: Taniguchi Megu
Team K: Kubo Satone
Team B: Fukuoka Seina
Team 4: Kawamoto Saya, Komiyama Haruka
Team 8: Kuranoo Narumi
Team H: Yabuki Nako

"Yaban na Kyuuai"
Dance Senbatsu (ダンス選抜) (8 Members) (Yamamoto Sayaka Center)

Team K: Fujita Nana
Team 8: Nakano Ikumi, Yokoyama Yui
Team S: Matsui Jurina
Team E: Saito Makiko
Team N: Yamamoto Sayaka
Team M: Kato Yuuka
Team KIV: Motomura Aoi

"Hotei Sokudo to Yuuetsukan"
AKB48 Group U-17 Senbatsu (AKB48グループ U-17選抜) (25 Members) (Oguri Yui Center)

Team A: Hiwatashi Yui
Team K: Kubo Satone
Team B: Goto Moe, Nishikawa Rei, Fukuoka Seina, Yamabe Ayu
Team 4: Chiba Erii
Team 8: Kuranoo Narumi, Oguri Yui, Sakaguchi Nagisa
AKB48 Kenkyuusei: Asai Nanami, Yamauchi Mizuki
Team KII: Obata Yuna
Team E: Goto Rara, Sugawara Maya
Team N: Yamamoto Ayaka
Team BII: Ota Yuuri, Jonishi Rei
Team H: Tanaka Miku, Yabuki Nako
Team TII: Matsuoka Hana
Team NIII: Takakura Moeka, Homma Hinata
STU48 1st Generation: Iwata Hina, Yabushita Fu

"Yosougai no Story"
Vocal Senbatsu (ボーカル選抜) (8 Members) (Okada Nana & Kashiwagi Yuki Center)

Team A: Yokoyama Yui
Team K: Tano Yuka, Minegishi Minami
Team B: Kashiwagi Yuki
Team 4: Okada Nana
Team KII: Takayanagi Akane
Team N: Yamamoto Sayaka
Team M: Shiroma Miru

Release history

References 

AKB48 songs
2017 singles
2017 songs
Songs with lyrics by Yasushi Akimoto
King Records (Japan) singles